Paul Bird C.Ss.R. (born 17 July 1949) is the Roman Catholic Bishop of Ballarat.

Bird was born in Newcastle, New South Wales, on 17 July 1949. He attended Catholic primary and high schools in the Newcastle area. He joined the formation program of the Congregation of the Most Holy Redeemer in 1968 and studied at the Redemptorist seminary at Wendouree near Ballarat for four years before completing his studies at the Yarra Theological Union in Melbourne. He was ordained as a priest on 17 May 1975 and appointed Bishop of Ballarat on 1 August 2012.

In January 2016, Bishop Paul Bird became the first bishop in Australia to publicly join a global movement showing support for clergy child sex abuse victims by tying bright coloured ribbons to the Loud Fence outside St Patrick's Cathedral, Ballarat. Bishop Bird said that “If there is just silence between two people, then one doesn’t know what the other is thinking”, and that “This gesture is a way to recognise the suffering and publicly show support to victims, survivors and their families”.

In 2016, Bird announced that the estate of a former Bishop of Ballarat Ronald Mulkearns, which had been left to the diocese, would be set aside to help victims of child sexual abuse committed by priests in the diocese. As bishop, Mulkearns had facilitated moving the priests to different parishes.

In August 2019, Bird acknowledged jailed former Melbourne Bishop George Pell's ties to the Ballarat Diocese and apologized for the history of sex abuse in the Diocese as well.

See also

Roman Catholic Church in Australia

References

Roman Catholic bishops of Ballarat
1949 births
Living people
People from Newcastle, New South Wales